The 1897 Latrobe Athletic Association season was their third season in existence. The team finished 10–2–1. This season, Latrobe became the first team to be made entirely of professional players and play an entire season together.

Schedule

Game notes

References

Latrobe Athletic Association
Latrobe Athletic Association seasons